Sanniki  is a town in Gostynin County, Masovian Voivodeship, in central Poland. It is the seat of the gmina (administrative district) called Gmina Sanniki.

The town has a population of 2,000.

History
Fryderyk Chopin, then 18, vacationed here in 1828.

Before World War II, the town had a Jewish community of 300 or so. During the German occupation of Poland, the Jews were forced to live in a small ghetto. In 1940, the German gendermerie and SS carried out expulsions of local Poles, who were sent to a transit camp in Kutno and then deported to forced labour in Germany. In 1941, the Jews were forced to demolish a local church so Germans could photograph it for their anti-semitic propaganda. In early 1942, the 250 Jews left in the ghetto were deported to the Chełmno extermination camp to be murdered. The number of Sanniki Jews who survived is unknown. From 1943 to 1945, the town was renamed by the German occupiers to Sannikau.

References

External links
 Jewish Community in Sanniki on Virtual Shtetl

Cities and towns in Masovian Voivodeship
Gostynin County